Scarborough Mere is a natural lake in the Weaponness Valley, in Scarborough, North Yorkshire, England.

In the 20th century, the Mere was a popular tourist attraction owned by Scarborough Corporation, with rowing boats, a café and putting green. There was also a miniature Spanish galleon – the Hispaniola – which made trips across to 'Treasure Island' where holidaymakers could dig for doubloons. Dredging and maintenance of the lake decreased, and the increased silt and weed meant that waterborne activities stopped.

The Mere is now part of the Oliver's Mount Country Park and is managed by the Scarborough Mere Angling Club as a fishing lake, with the southern end used by waterskiers.

A map dated 1766 by Thomas Bowen in The Gentleman's Magazine shows Scarborough Mere as "a lake called Byard's Lake".

References

Bibliography

External links
 Details of Scarborough Mere Angling Club

Tourist attractions in North Yorkshire
Scarborough, North Yorkshire
Lakes of North Yorkshire